Samatasvir (IDX-719) is an experimental drug for the treatment of hepatitis C. It was originally developed by Idenix, and development has been continued by Merck & Co. following their acquisition of Idenix. Samatasvir has shown good results in Phase II trials.

Samatasvir is a highly potent and selective inhibitor of the hepatitis C virus NS5A replication complex. While it showed promising results when administered as monotherapy, it is probable that samatasvir would be marketed as a combination product with other anti-hepatitis drugs to increase efficacy and reduce the chance of resistance developing, as with most other novel treatments for hepatitis C currently under development. Trials of samatasvir in combination with other antiviral drugs such as simeprevir are also underway.

See also 
 Discovery and development of NS5A inhibitors

References 

NS5A inhibitors
Pyrrolidines
Benzimidazoles
Carbamates
Experimental drugs